Delia Abbiatti (born 1918) is an Argentinian botanist and pteridologist, noted for studying Eriocaulaceae, Loranthaceae, Thelypteris, and Cyclosorus.  The species Perezia abbiattii and Thelypteris abbiattii were named in her honor.

References 

 1918 births
 Year of death missing
 Argentine women scientists
20th-century Argentine botanists